Sébastien Lareau and Alex O'Brien won in the final 6–3, 7–6(7–3) against Todd Woodbridge and Mark Woodforde.

Seeds
The top four seeded teams received byes into the second round.

Draw

Finals

Top half

Bottom half

External links
 1999 Stella Artois Championships Doubles Draw

Doubles